Loxomima is a genus of moths in the subfamily Arctiinae. It contains the single species Loxomima imitans.

References

Natural History Museum Lepidoptera generic names catalog

Arctiinae